ZM (and similar) may refer to:
 Zambia, a southern African country (ISO 3166-1: ZM)
 .zm, Zambia's Internet top-level domain

Arts and media
 ZM (radio station), a New Zealand broadcaster
 Zara Moussa, a Nigerian rapper

Business
 Zoom Video Communications, an American developer of videotelephony software (Nasdaq ticker: ZM)

Units of measure
 Zeptometre, an extremely small unit of length (10-21 m)
 Zeptomolar (zM), a unit of molar concentration
 Zettametre (Zm), an extremely large unit of length (1021 m)

nl:Lijst van Poolse historische motorfietsmerken#ZM